William Wilka (born 20 March 1947) is a Paraguayan sports shooter. He competed in the men's 25 metre rapid fire pistol event at the 1984 Summer Olympics.

References

External links
 

1947 births
Living people
Paraguayan male sport shooters
Olympic shooters of Paraguay
Shooters at the 1984 Summer Olympics
Place of birth missing (living people)
20th-century Paraguayan people